Events in the year 2003 in Spain.

Incumbents 

 Monarch: Juan Carlos I
 Prime Minister: José María Aznar López

Events 

 2 January – Oil leakage from the sunken tanker Prestige threatens the southwestern coast of France. The prefect of Aquitaine reported a slick from the tanker is 50 kilometers (30 standard miles) from the coast. French Prime Minister Jean-Pierre Raffarin promised 50 million euros for the cleanup. The Prestige, which carried 77,000 tonnes of crude oil, sunk in late November 2002, off the coast of the Galician region of Spain.
 17 March – Iraq disarmament crisis: Japanese prime minister Junichiro Koizumi said that he supports the U.S., U.K., and Spain for ending diplomatic efforts against Iraq. He also indicates no further UN resolution is necessary to invade Iraq.
 22 June – Real Madrid clinches the Primera división, the top football league in Spain, beating Real Sociedad by two points. The very next day, Real fires its manager, Vicente del Bosque.
 7 July – Thousands of people take part in the first bull run of the annual San Fermín festival in Pamplona, Spain. No serious injuries or gorings were reported.
 24 October – Three same-sex couples in Spain, including a Madrid city councilman, apply for marriage licenses. They state that if the registry judge does not grant them the licenses, they will appeal to Spain's constitutional court, and as far as the European Court of Human Rights if necessary. They describe their actions as inspired by the recent rulings on same-sex marriage in Canada.
 13 December – Spain has announced an agreement with Morocco to proceed with plans to build a rail tunnel beneath the Strait of Gibraltar, linking Europe and Africa. Assuming the project is technically and financially feasible, digging would start in 2008.

Sports 

 2002–03 La Liga
 2002–03 Segunda División
 2002–03 Copa del Rey
 2003 Vuelta a España

Deaths 

 21 January – Antonio Domínguez Ortiz, 93, Spanish historian.
 10 February – Carmen Vidal, 87, Spanish cosmetologist and businesswoman.
 24 February – Antoni Torres, 59, Spanish footballer
 10 March – Víctor Alba, 86, Spanish writer and anti-communist, anti-capitalist political journalist
 31 March – Fermín Vélez, 43, Spanish sports car racing driver, two-time 12 Hours of Sebring winner, two-time Group C2 champion
 2 April – Terenci Moix, 61, Spanish writer
 7 April – Julio Anguita Parrado, 32, Spanish journalist and war correspondent (El Mundo)
 9 May – Antonio Ibáñez Freire, 89, Spanish politician and army officer.
 4 June – Serafín Rojo, 77, Spanish cartoonist and painter.
 7 July – Antonio Iranzo, 73, Spanish film actor.
 15 July – Roberto Bolaño, 50, Chilean-Spanish writer (The Savage Detectives, 2666)
 15 August – Enric Llaudet, 86, Spanish businessman and sports executive.
 1 September – Ramón Serrano Suñer, 101, Spanish politician.
 18 October – Manuel Vázquez Montalbán, 64, Spanish novelist (Detective Carvalho saga), journalist and poet
 19 October – Jaime Allende, 79, Spanish field hockey player (field hockey at the 1948 Summer Olympics)
 28 October – Joan Perucho, 82, Spanish novelist, poet and art critic, and judge
 31 October – José Juncosa, 81, Spanish football player and manager.
 24 November – Floquet de Neu, 38-40, Spanish only albino western lowland gorilla in the world.
 3 December – Dulce Chacón, 49, Spanish poet, novelist and playwright, Pancreatic cancer.
 7 December – Barta Barri, 92, Hungarian-Spanish film actor.
 21 December – Prince Alfonso of Hohenlohe-Langenburg, 79, Spanish businessman and playboy
 27 December – Enric Bernat, 80, Spanish businessman, founder of Chupa Chups

See also 

 2003 in Spanish television
 List of Spanish films of 2003

References 

 
Spain
Years of the 21st century in Spain
2000s in Spain
Spain